A chine is a steep-sided river valley where a river flows through coastal cliffs to a sea.

Chine or chines may also refer to:
Chine (boating), a relatively sharp angle in a boat's hull
Chine (aeronautics), a long extension of the wing roots along the fuselage
Chine, the bony part of a meat chop
Stuffed chine, a traditional dish of Lincolnshire
Chine, the back of the blade on a scythe
Chine, the French name for China
 Chiné, a warp printed silk fabric